The Wick-Seiler House is a historic house in Helena, Montana. It was designed in the Italianate style, and built in 1888 for John Wick and his wife, née Philipia Offenbaker, two immigrants from Germany. The Wicks lived here with their three children, including Elizabeth, who married Arthur Seiler, also an immigrant from Germany, and later lived in the house with her family. The house was listed on the National Register of Historic Places in 2000.

References

National Register of Historic Places in Helena, Montana
Houses completed in 1888
1888 establishments in Montana Territory
Houses in Lewis and Clark County, Montana
Houses on the National Register of Historic Places in Montana
Italianate architecture in Montana